Gleim may refer to:

Johann Wilhelm Ludwig Gleim (1719–1803), a German poet
29197 Gleim, a main belt asteroid